David Douglas Preece (born 26 August 1976) is an English football journalist and commentator and a former professional player and coach who played as a goalkeeper.

He made the majority of his appearances for Darlington, Aberdeen and the Danish club Silkeborg. His final professional appearance came on 2 November 2013 for Lincoln City against Welling United.

Career

Early career
Preece was born Sunderland, Tyne and Wear. He began his football career in his hometown at Sunderland but failed to make a senior appearance before joining Darlington for free on a two-year deal. At Darlington, Preece made over 100 appearances in two seasons before leaving Darlington to move to Scotland by joining Aberdeen. Since leaving Darlington, the club attempted to re-sign Preece but the move never materialised. At Aberdeen, Preece made over 100 appearances in 6 seasons and faced competition from Jim Leighton, Peter Kjær and Ryan Esson. Up until Kjær's retirement, Preece began to get more playing time and captained the team on several occasions, until the club decided to transfer list Preece along with three other players.

In 2005, Preece left Scotland to move to Denmark by joining Silkeborg IF first and OB second. At Silkeborg, Preece was a first-choice goalkeeper until he left for OB where his first-team opportunities began to decline due to Arkadiusz Onyszko pushing him out of the first team.

Barnsley
After being released by OB, Preece returned to England by joining Barnsley free on a one-year contract, with the option to extend the contract by a further year, and was expected to compete with Luke Steele. After spending the first half of the season on the bench, Preece's big chance of his first team came when he made his debut for the club (and first team in English football for 10 years) in a 1–0 loss against Watford on 12 September 2009 and continued in goal for three consecutive games until Steele returned. At the end of the season, Preece signed another one-year deal despite being Barnsley's back-up goalkeeper. Preece continued to be a back-up goalkeeper and during the 2011–12 season, Preece suffered a wrist injury while warming up ahead of a match against Southampton, resulting him out of the rest of the season At the end of the season, Preece was released along with six other players, ending a three-year spell at Barnsley.

Lincoln City
On 5 December 2012, Preece signed non-contract terms with Lincoln City and made his debut in a 4–2 win over Dartford. On 28 December 2012 his contract was made permanent until the end of the season in a player-coach capacity. Preece played a pivotal role in saving Lincoln from relegation.

Keflavik
In April 2013, Preece joined Icelandic Premier League team Keflavík on a short-term deal following a brief loan. Preece made this decision to ensure he was as fit as possible for the start of the English football league season in August 2013.

Return to Lincoln
On 8 August 2013, Preece re-signed for Lincoln City on a one-year deal, also becoming the club's first team goalkeeping coach.

References

External links
David Preece profile at barnsleyfc.co.uk

1976 births
Living people
Footballers from Sunderland
English footballers
Association football goalkeepers
Sunderland A.F.C. players
Darlington F.C. players
Aberdeen F.C. players
Silkeborg IF players
Odense Boldklub players
Barnsley F.C. players
Lincoln City F.C. players
Knattspyrnudeild Keflavík players
Scottish Premier League players
Danish Superliga players
English expatriate footballers
English expatriate sportspeople in Denmark
Expatriate men's footballers in Denmark
English expatriate sportspeople in Iceland
Expatriate footballers in Iceland